Maurice Bucaille (19 July 1920 – 17 February 1998) was a doctor and a specialist in the field of gastroenterology who was appointed as the family physician of Faisal of Saudi Arabia in 1973. His patients included the members of the family of Egyptian President Anwar Sadat.

Bucaille is primarily known for his book The Bible, The Qur'an and Science that he wrote following his study of the mummy of the Egyptian pharaoh Ramesses II. The book contained multiple references to the Quran, relating science and Quran in which Bucaille concluded that the Quran is a divine revelation and that it was not written by any man;. Literary critic Sameer Rahim wrote in The Daily Telegraph that some of Bucaille's "assertions have been ridiculed by scientists and sophisticated theologians."

The book gave rise to a movement called Bucailleism, which tries to relate modern science with religion, especially Islam. Since the publishing of The Bible, the Quran and Science, Bucaillists have promoted the idea that the Quran is of divine origin, arguing that it contains scientifically correct facts. According to The Wall Street Journal, Bucailleism is "in some ways the Muslim counterpart to Christian creationism" and although "while creationism rejects much of modern science, Bucailleism embraces it."

Publications
 La Bible, le Coran et la Science : Les Écritures Saintes examinées à la lumière des connaissances modernes, Seghers 1976,, Pocket 2003,
Les Momies des pharaons et la médecine, Séguier, 1987. Mummies of the Pharaohs: Modern Medical Investigations by Maurice Bucaille. Translated by Alastair D. Pannell and the author. Illustrated. 236 pp. New York: St. Martin's Press.
 Réflexions sur le Coran, with Mohamed Talbi, Seghers, (Reflections on the Koran), 1989.
 L'homme d'où vient-il? Les réponses de la science et des Écritures Saintes (Where does man come from? The responses of science and Scripture), Seghers, 1980 7ème éd.().
 
 Moïse et Pharaon ; Les Hébreux en Egypte ; (Moses and Pharaoh, The Hebrews in Egypt) Quelles concordances de Livres saints avec l'Histoire, Seghers, 1995.

See also
 Keith L. Moore
 Islam and science
 Religion and science

References

Further reading
 
 
  (A philosophical criticism of Bucaille's theories)

External links

 The Qur'an & The Modern Science - Dr. Maurice Bucaille || All in One || Via YouTube.
 Bucaille speaking YouTube: Dr. Maurice Bucaille -The Qur'an & Modern Science - Part 01.flv
 The Bible, Qur’an and Science book and history of Dr Maurice Bucaille – by Dr Zakir Naik On YouTube.

1920 births
1998 deaths
French Sunni Muslims
French Muslims
French former Christians
People from Pont-l'Évêque, Calvados
French gastroenterologists
Islam-related controversies
Writers about religion and science